Courtney Rummel (born November 12, 2003) is an American professional snowboarder, specializing in big air and slopestyle. Rummel was named to the US Team for the 2022 Winter Olympics, finishing 19th in the big air event and 17th in the slopestyle event. She also competed in the 2020 Winter Youth Olympics.

Early life 
Rummel was born to her mother, Kimberly Rummel, and father, John Rummel, on November 12, 2003.

Rummel was inspired to start snowboarding after seeing her brother, Cole, win competitions. She would first make an appearance at Sunburst Ski Hill in Kewaskum, Wisconsin.

Career

2022 Winter Olympics 
On January 23, she was announced to had been selected to be one of the 26 snowboarders for Team USA for the 2022 Winter Olympics. She would finish 19th in the big air event, failing to qualify, and 17th in the slopestyle event, also failing to qualify.

Personal life 
Rummel went to West Bend High School. She has three sisters, Kelsey, Chloe, and Kendall, and one brother, Cole.

References

External links 

 
 Courtney Rummel at U.S. Ski & Snowboard

2003 births
Living people
People from West Bend, Wisconsin
Sportspeople from Wisconsin
Snowboarders at the 2022 Winter Olympics
Olympic snowboarders of the United States
21st-century American women
Snowboarders at the 2020 Winter Youth Olympics